Zaghmar (also Romanized as Zaghmār; also known as Sheydān Barāān and Zagnaur) is a village in Baraan-e Jonubi Rural District, in the Central District of Isfahan County, Isfahan Province, Iran. At the 2006 census, its population was 110, in 27 families.

References 

Populated places in Isfahan County